Hugh Syme is a Canadian Juno Award-winning graphic artist and member of the Premier Artists Collection (PAC) who is best known for his artwork and cover concepts for rock and metal bands. He is also a musician and has appeared on some Rush albums as a keyboard player. Syme is notably responsible for all of Rush's album cover art since 1975's Caress of Steel as well as creating Rush's famous Starman logo. In 1983 he told Jeffrey Morgan that he never imagined the band would use it as their main logo. Syme also plays piano on the album Thrilling Women, which Morgan recorded with Dean Motter.

His client base includes major record companies like Geffen Records, EMI Records, Mercury Records, RCA Records, Capitol Records, Sony Music, Atlantic Records, Warner Bros. Records and A&M Records.

Iron Maiden fans remember him best as the designer of The X Factor cover, which shows the band's mascot Eddie dissected. It is remembered for its gritty realism. Whereas all previous Maiden albums were oil paintings, the X Factor Eddie was a puppet with some digital touch-ups to enhance its look. In some countries the cover was considered so gruesome that a less gory alternative was offered (the alternative cover is actually the back of the original CD booklet).

Def Leppard's Retro Active album cover, which he co-designed with Nels Israelson, shows a lady sitting at a dressing table, looking in a mirror. From another perspective, it takes the form of a skull (a type of vanitas art), the woman's head forming the left eye socket, and her reflected head in the mirror forming the right eye socket. The mirror itself forms the shape of the skull and the accessories on the dressing table form the nose, nostrils and teeth. It was inspired by Charles Allan Gilbert's most famous work, All Is Vanity (1892).

Other bands Syme has done artwork for include: Megadeth, Saga, Styx, Altered State, Fates Warning, Whitesnake, Queensrÿche, Aerosmith, and Dream Theater.

Personal
Hugh Syme has studios in Toronto, Ontario, Canada and in Indiana, USA. Syme is co-host of the Music Buzzz Podcast along with Dane Clark and Andy Wilson.

Album cover art 
Chronological list of Hugh Syme's album cover art (including studio, live, compilation and extended play LPs).

Discography 
Syme has contributed as a musician with Ian Thomas Band, Rush and Tiles.

with Ian Thomas Band
 Delights - piano, Fender Rhodes, Mellotron and background vocals
 Calabash - keyboards, background vocals and creative companionship and album cover artwork
 Still Here - keyboards and background vocals (co-arrangement on "I Really Love You" and "Tinkerbell")
 Glider - keyboards and all songs arranged with Ian Thomas
 The Runner - keyboards and background vocals

with Rush
 2112 - ARP synthesizer intro to "2112: Overture" and Mellotron and ARP Odyssey on "Tears" 
 Permanent Waves - piano on "Different Strings" 
 Moving Pictures - synthesizers on "Witch Hunt" 

with Tiles
 Window Dressing - keyboards on "Slippers in the Snow"
 Fly Paper - keyboards on "Crowded Emptiness" and solo piano on "Passing Notes"

with Alice in Chains
 2112 - 40th Anniversary Deluxe Reissue - Mellotron, string arrangement, woodwinds, and boy's choir on Geddy Lee's re-released song "Tears"

with Jim McCarty
 Walking in the Wild Land - Piano, nylon and steel string acoustic guitar, synths, string arrangements, boy's choir, Mellotron on "Changing Times", "Dancing Leaves" and "So Many Questions". James Stanley McCarty (born 25 July 1943) is an English musician, best known as the drummer for the Yardbirds and Renaissance.

Awards 
Juno Awards: 5 wins and 18 nominations.

1999: Best Album Design nomination - Different Stages by Rush, with Geddy Lee and Andrew MacNaughtan
1993: Best Album Design nomination - Dear Dear by 54-40
1992: Best Album Design nomination - Big House by Big House
1992: Best Album Design win - Roll the Bones by Rush
1991: Best Album Design nomination - Oceanview Motel by Mae Moore
1991: Best Album Design nomination - Snow in June by The Northern Pikes
1990: Best Album Design win - Presto by Rush
1990: Best Album Design nomination - Rockland by Kim Mitchell
1989: Best Album Graphics win - Levity by Ian Thomas
1986: Best Album Graphics nomination - Robot Man and Friends by Peter Shelly, with Heather Brown and Peter Shelly
1986: Best Album Graphics win - Power Windows by Rush, with Dimo Safari
1985: Best Album Graphics nomination - At the Feet of the Moon by Parachute Club, with Deborah Samuel
1983: Best Album Graphics nomination - Signals by Rush
1983: Best Album Graphics nomination - One False Move by Harlequin
1982: Best Album Graphics nomination - Exit...Stage Left by Rush, with Deborah Samuel
1982: Best Album Graphics win - Moving Pictures by Rush, with Deborah Samuel
1981: Best Album Graphics nomination - Lookin' for Trouble by Toronto, with Michael Gray
1978: Best Album Graphics nomination - A Farewell to Kings by Rush

References

External links
 Hugh Syme biography
 Hugh Syme homepage
 Music Buzzz Podcast homepage
 Hugh's Premier Artists Collection (PAC) profile

Canadian graphic designers
Juno Award for Recording Package of the Year winners
Living people
Album-cover and concert-poster artists
Canadian poster artists
Canadian rock keyboardists
1953 births